Chaim Dov Rabinowitz (1909 – April 2001) was a Lithuanian born rabbi who authored a monumental commentary on the Hebrew Bible (Daat Soferim) and a history of the Jewish people (From Nechemia to the Present).

Biography
Rabinowitz was the son of the rabbi of Isoblin in the Vilna Governorate. He studied under some of the foremost Haredi leaders of the time such as Elchonon Wasserman and Shimon Shkop.

Rabinowitz moved to Israel shortly before the World War II (1937) settling in Tel Aviv. There he directed the Ohel Yaakov Talmud Torah, the first Hareidi Talmud Torah in that city. In the aftermath of the war, Rabinowitz was very active on behalf of the immigrants in the transit camps.

Biblical exegesis
Rabinowitz's magnum opus is Daat Sofrim, a commentary on all of the Hebrew Bible. There are several distinguishing features to this work. The first is his attempt to de-emphasize the negative aspects of ancient Jewish life that appear in the Bible. Rabinowitz in his role of "Defender of Israel" emphasizes that seen within the correct context, and with a proper understanding of the historical background, the negative stories are scarcely as bad as they appear. (See for example his explanation defining the differences between the story of the Levite concubine at Giveah and the story of Sodom)

A second interesting feature are his (possibly the only Haredi) attempts to resolve some of the issues raised by biblical criticism. Thus he identifies the second part of the Book of Isaiah as possibly being written by a different author based on an oral tradition from Isaiah.

History
Rabinowitz, in his volume on history, (From Nechemia to the Present) emphasizes that the study of history in and of itself is a waste of time. One must focus to a large degree on the moral lessons inherent in the history. In line with this each chapter is divided into two sections. The first section is a brief overview of the period under discussion. The second is an in depth discussion, in question and answer form, on the difficult aspects of history. For example, he questions what led the Jews to leave a relatively peaceful life in Iraq for the more difficult, anti-semitic countries in Europe. At all opportunities Rabinowitz demonstrates what he sees as the "hand of G-d" directing the course of history.

Sources
For the Second Temple and Geonic period, Rabinowitz largely quotes the opinion of Yitzchok Isaac Halevy although he frequently disagrees with his interpretation of events. This period is also based on the writings of Josephus and the Talmud. He also makes use of the historians Ze'ev Jawitz and Heinrich Graetz, and occasionally cites Encyclopaedia Judaica as well.

Rabinowitz presents an idiosyncratic Jewish Orthodox picture of history. For example, as opposed to the typical Haredi viewpoint that Moses Mendelssohn caused the assimilation of German Jewry, Rabinowitz writes that Mendelssohn's work was in fact very similar to that of the founder of neo-orthodoxy Samson Raphael Hirsch and that assimilation was mostly a result of the challenges of the Enlightenment.

In his discussions he analyses several social issues that were improperly or insufficiently remedied in the past. For instance, he expresses astonishment that the issue of education for Jewish girls was so long ignored given the obvious need for such an institution.

His works bear approbations from most of the leading Haredi rabbis of his time including: Yaakov Kamenetsky, Moshe Feinstein, the Lubavitcher Rebbe and many others.

Partial bibliography
 Daat Soferim commentary on the Hebrew Bible (Heb. with an English translation available)
 From Nechemia to the Present (Heb. with an English translation available)
 A guide to teaching the early prophets (Heb.)
 Recollections (Heb.) - Description of the pre-war Lithuanian Jewish yeshiva world

References
https://hebrewbooks.org/39781, 
http://www.chareidi.org/archives5761/achrei/ACHarabinowitz.htm

External links
 Obituary
 Daat Sofrim on the Book of Genesis (in Hebrew)
 Daat Sofrim on the Book of Exodus (in Hebrew)
 Daat Sofrim on the Book of Leviticus (in Hebrew)
 Daat Sofrim on the Book of Numbers (in Hebrew)
 Daat Sofrim on the Book of Deuteronomy (in Hebrew)
 Daat Sofrim on the Book of  Joshua (in Hebrew)
 Daat Sofrim on the Book of Judges (in Hebrew)
 Daat Sofrim on the Book of Samuel 1 (in Hebrew)
 Daat Sofrim on the Book of Samuel 2 (in Hebrew)
 Daat Sofrim on the Book of Kings (in Hebrew)
 Daat Sofrim on the Book of Ezekiel (in Hebrew)

1909 births
2001 deaths
Bible commentators
Haredi rabbis in Israel
Jewish historians
Lithuanian Haredi rabbis
Haredi rabbis in Mandatory Palestine